Hanwang is an atonal pinyin romanization of various Chinese names and words.

It may refer to:

 Mount Hanwang (汉王山), an informal name for Bozhong Mountain in China's Shaanxi Province

Towns and townships in China
Hanwang, Gansu (汉王), a town in Longnan, Gansu
Hanwang, Jiangsu (汉王), a town in Xuzhou, Jiangsu
Hanwang, Hanzhong (汉王), a town in Hanzhong, Shaanxi
Hanwang, Ziyang County (汉王), a town in Ziyang County, Shaanxi
Hanwang, Sichuan (汉旺), a town in Mianzhu, Sichuan
Hanwang Township (寒王乡), a township in Zuoquan County, Shanxi

See also
Han Wang (disambiguation)